Hints is a civil parish in the district of Lichfield, Staffordshire, England.  It contains seven buildings that are recorded in the National Heritage List for England.  Of these, one is listed at Grade II*, the middle grade, and the others are at Grade II, the lowest grade.  The parish contains the village of Hints and the surrounding countryside.  The listed buildings consist of two churches, a cross and memorials in one of the churchyards, a farmhouse, and a group of farm buildings.


Key

Buildings

References

Citations

Sources

Lists of listed buildings in Staffordshire